Richard Fisk is a fictional character, a criminal appearing in American comic books published by Marvel Comics. The character first appears in The Amazing Spider-Man #83 (April 1970) and was created by Stan Lee and John Romita Sr. He is the son of Wilson Fisk and Vanessa Fisk. Although originally portrayed as a villain, he later became an antihero.

A younger version of the character appeared in the 2018 animated film, Spider-Man: Into the Spider-Verse.

Publication history
The character Richard Fisk first appears as The Schemer in The Amazing Spider-Man #83 (April 1970), created by Stan Lee and John Romita Sr. He first appeared as The Rose in The Amazing Spider-Man #253 (June 1984), but was not revealed as the Rose until The Amazing Spider-Man #286 (March 1987).

Fictional character biography
Richard Fisk grew up as a child of privilege, believing that his father Wilson Fisk was a respectable and honorable businessman. Wilson was sometimes abusive to Richard, but Richard still loved him. At one point he and his childhood friend Samuel Silke saw Wilson roughing up someone. It was when he was attending a prestigious college in Switzerland that he discovered that his father was, in reality, the Kingpin of Crime. Realizing the luxuries of his youth had been financed by a criminal empire, Richard was distraught and vowed to make atonement for his father's crimes. When his parents received word that Richard had perished in a skiing accident, they suspected that it was really a suicide after Richard learned the truth of his father's identity. Heartbroken and furious that his son could have acted so spinelessly, the Kingpin sunk into a spell of depression.

Operating as Schemer

Not long afterward, a new gang emerged in New York, led by a mysterious figure calling himself the Schemer. Unlike most gangs in New York, the Schemer's organization seemed bent solely on dismantling the Kingpin's empire. After a series of confrontations, the Kingpin and the Schemer finally met face to face. It was then that the Schemer revealed that his face was really a mask, and that his true face was that of Richard Fisk. Richard explained that he had faked his death in the Alps and was striking back at his father using his own money. This final shock was too much for the Kingpin to bear, and he collapsed into catatonia. This finally made Richard realize how much he had hurt his father, and he set off to find a way to cure his comatose state. Richard joined the international terrorist group HYDRA, becoming a leader of the Nevada fragment of HYDRA and eventually rising to the rank of Supreme Hydra.  Now with HYDRA's expansive resources at his disposal, Richard was able to return his father to full health. The Kingpin, reconciled with his son, proved that he was back to normal by clandestinely taking over as ruler of HYDRA. However, it was soon revealed that the true leader of HYDRA was the Nazi supervillain the Red Skull, and the Fisks had to team up with Captain America and the Falcon to stop the mad dictator. Richard was critically wounded in the final battle, and the Kingpin had his son placed in suspended animation, finally curing him by siphoning some life force from Spider-Man.

Operating as Rose
Several years later, Richard joined his father's organization, calling himself the Rose, a crime lord under the Kingpin's control. However, this was all a ruse to undermine the Kingpin's empire from within. Aiding Richard in this scheme were his good friend Alfredo Morelli and Ned Leeds, who was brainwashed to act as the supervillain the Hobgoblin. However, the Rose's subterfuge resulted in an explosive gang war that tore New York City apart. During a shoot-out Richard shot and killed a police officer, an act that became a turning point for him - no longer could he consider himself morally superior to his father. After Leeds' death and the end of the gang war, Richard resigned himself to his birthright and rejoined the Kingpin's organization as himself. However, the desire to overthrow his father once again arose, and Richard and Alfredo plotted to make the Kingpin think that Richard was ready to inherit his father's position. Alfredo had plastic surgery to make himself look just like Richard (since he had more combat experience), and slowly began climbing the ladder of power. However, when the Kingpin was overthrown by the combined forces of Daredevil and HYDRA, Alfredo betrayed his old friend by maintaining that he was truly Richard, and took over as the new Kingpin. Richard then became Blood Rose, a Punisher-like vigilante, and began gunning down criminals in a bloody purge of the city. The Blood Rose even shot and wounded Alfredo, who later returned under the alias of Gauntlet, although he was ultimately defeated by NightWatch and incarcerated. Finally caught by Spider-Man and arrested, Richard entered the Witness Protection Program.

New life
Years later, Wilson Fisk once again regained the mantle of the Kingpin, and Richard re-emerged to public life and rejoined the Kingpin's organization, once again vowing to never again attempt to overthrow his father. However, upon meeting his old childhood friend, the ambitious enforcer Silke, Richard thought that he at last had found the perfect way to make his father pay for his crimes. Silke's assassination attempt nearly did succeed, stabbing and seriously wounding the Kingpin (already blinded from an earlier attempt on his life). However, Richard did not count on the tenacity of his mother Vanessa. Vanessa quickly made a startling counterstrike, eliminating the rebellion and selling her husband's territory so he could travel to Europe and recover. Richard cornered her, insisting that by getting rid of the Kingpin they could be free to have a new life, but Vanessa coldly shot her son dead, eliminating him as a threat once and for all.

At the time when Wilson Fisk was the Mayor of New York, Richard was later resurrected by his father who used the Tablet of Life and Destiny and the Tablet of Death and Entropy, once again assuming the Rose persona.

During the "Devil's Reign" storyline, Rose assisted his father in apprehending superheroes after Mayor Fisk had them outlawed. After visiting the police station where Ben Reilly as Spider-Man broke out, Beyond Corporation member Marcus Momplaiser has been ambushed by Rose. Rose is confronted by two Thunderbolts agents who state that Spider-Man got away. After driving away the Thunderbolts agents, Rose goes to Plan B and prepares to torture his Marcus. Rose has been unable to get any useful information out of Marcus and will still have a use for him. Becoming Spider-Man, Ben Reilly finds the Thunderbolts agents arresting someone dressed as Spider-Man. Spider-Man defeats the Thunderbolts agents and finds out that Marcus was dressed as Spider-Man as he advises Spider-Man to get away. Just then, Rose appears with the same S.H.I.E.L.D. weapon some Thunderbolts agents used on him and attacks Spider-Man where he reveals that he spiked Marcus' Spider-Man costume with electrodes which he uses to shock them. Before Rose can finish of Spider-Man, Marcus uses one of the Thunderbolts agents electric sticks which helps him to knock out Rose. The Thunderbolts agents bring to the NYPD someone in a Spider-Man outfit. He is unmasked to be a gagged Rose with the words "Here's Johnny" on the tape that's over his mouth.

Powers and abilities
Richard Fisk has no superhuman powers, however he is trained in the use of guns and has some martial arts training. He is highly intelligent and also has a number of criminal contacts. As the Rose he wears a bulletproof three-piece suit. He always carries a handgun and often a variety of mini-grenades as well.

Other versions
Another version of Richard Fisk appeared in Punisher MAX's first story arc called "Kingpin". Here, he is depicted as an eight-year-old child rather than a young adult, and his death is caused by his father's takeover of the mob. During his final confrontation with Fisk, mob boss Rigoletto takes Richard hostage and threatens to kill him but Fisk, showing no concern for his son's fate, stands idly by as Rigoletto slits the boy's throat. Fisk later reflects that he had always thought that he was trying to advance his criminal career for his son's sake, while in reality it was only for himself. Richard's fate causes Vanessa Fisk to plot the downfall of her estranged husband.

In other media

Television 
 Richard Fisk appeared in Spider-Man, voiced by Nick Jameson. This version is loyal to his father and heads a front company called Fisktronics. In the episodes "Framed" and "The Man Without Fear", Peter Parker was hired to work for Richard at Fisktronics by Wilson Fisk. Richard frames Parker for selling government secrets with the Chameleon's help. Spider-Man and Daredevil successfully team up to clear Parker's name, which results in Richard being arrested. In "Guilty", Richard teams up with Tombstone to frame Robbie Robertson, who is sent to Ryker's Island, where he shares a cell with the two. After Spider-Man and J. Jonah Jameson prove Robbie's innocence, Spider-Man rescues Robbie and prevents Richard and Tombstone from escaping by helicopter. In "The Prowler", Richard makes his final appearance in a flashback being saved by Hobie Brown, which enables Wilson to have a hot-shot lawyer secure Brown's release.

Film 
 A younger version of Richard Fisk appears in Spider-Man: Into the Spider-Verse. This version grew up not knowing of his father's criminal activities, until he and Vanessa Fisk witnessed him fighting Spider-Man, and fled in horror. While driving away, Vanessa and Richard were hit by an oncoming truck and killed. This motivated Wilson to create a particle accelerator to find alternate versions of his family in other universes.

References

External links
 

Characters created by John Romita Sr.
Characters created by Stan Lee
Comics characters introduced in 1970
Fictional characters from New York City
Fictional gangsters
Fictional murderers
Hydra (comics) agents
Marvel Comics male supervillains
Marvel Comics martial artists
Marvel Comics supervillains
Spider-Man characters
Vigilante characters in comics